Zaqatala "Simurq" is a multi-use stadium in Zaqatala, Azerbaijan. It is currently used mostly for football matches and it considered as home ground of FK Simurq Zaqatala, since October 2008.

The stadium was built in the area Galadyuzyu in place of old arena. The total area of 2.3 hectares. The draft was prepared by the Bulgarian "Dynamic Resource", commissioned by the company "General Constructions". The work took place from 2006 to August 2008. At its construction has been spent around US$12 million. The stadium holds 3500 spectators, one-sided platform for VIP-guests, calculated at 181. The main field, the size of which 105x68 meters of artificial surface, several small training lawns, artificial lighting, drainage and modern electronic street system, running track, tickets for ticketing, special places for the disabled, a large heating system, water reservoir at 300 cubic meters - this is the basic indicators of the stadium «Simurq».

The first floor of building is only for teams and judges. There are rooms for each team, doctors and massage rooms, a laboratory for doping tests, the press center. On the second floor there are Internet cafes, bars, VIP-bar, but on the third floor there seats for the press.

References

External links
1.http://dynamicsport.eu/

Football venues in Azerbaijan
Multi-purpose stadiums in Azerbaijan
Sports venues completed in 2008
Simurq PIK
2008 establishments in Azerbaijan